This is a demography of the population of Sri Lanka including population density, ethnicity, education level, health of the populace, economic status, religious affiliations and other aspects of the population.

Sri Lanka is an island in the Indian Ocean, also called Ceylon and many other names. It is about the size of Ireland. It is about 28 kilometres (18 mi.) off the south-eastern coast of India with a population of about 22 million. Density is highest in the south west where Colombo, the country's main port and industrial center, is located. The net population growth is about 0.7%. Sri Lanka is ethnically, linguistically, and religiously diverse.

Overview

According to the 2012 census the population of Sri Lanka was 20,359,439, giving a population density of 325/km2. The population had grown by 5,512,689 (37.1%) since the 1981 census (the last full census), equivalent to an annual growth rate of 1.1%. 3,704,470 (18.2%) lived in urban sectors - areas governed by municipal and urban councils.

5,131,666 (25.2%) of the population were aged 14 or under whilst 2,525,573 (12.4%) were aged 60 or over, leaving a working age (15-59) population of 12,702,700. The dependency ratio was 60.2%. The mean age was 32 years and the median age was 31 years. The sex ratio was 94 males per 100 females. The fertility rate for married females aged 15 or over was 2.65 live births. There were 5,264,282 households, of which 3,986,236 (75.7%) were headed by males and 1,278,046 (24.3%) were headed by females.

Of the 15,227,773 aged 15 or over, 10,322,105 (67.8%) were married, 3,927,602 (25.8%) were never married, 792,947 (5.2%) were widowed and 185,119 (1.2%) were divorced or separated.

Of those aged 15 or over, 7,857,370 (51.6%) were economically active, 4,199,558 (27.6%) did housework, 1,431,105 (9.4%) were students, 914,934 (6.0%) were unable to work and 346,084 (2.3%) were pensioners. 521,938 (6.6%) of the economically active were unemployed. 604,540 Sri Lankans were living aboard for more than six months but were intending to return to Sri Lanka, mostly in the Gulf states (373,050 61.7%).

The overall literacy rate for those aged 10 and over was 95.7% but amongst those living in the estate sector it was only 86.1%. Of the 18,615,577 aged 5 or over, 499,563 (2.7%) had received a higher education qualification, 2,293,841 (12.3%) had passed G.C.E. A/L, 3,159,402 (17.0%) had passed G.C.E. O/L and 700,419 (3.8%) had no formal schooling. The remaining 11,962,352 (64.3%) had left school with no qualifications or were currently at school.

Sri Lanka's population is aging faster than any other nation in South Asia and has the fifth highest rapidly growing population of older people in Asia after China, Thailand, South Korea and Japan. In 2015, Sri Lanka's population aged over 60 was 13.9%, by 2030 this will increase to 21% and by 2050 this number will reach 27.4%. Sri Lanka's rapidly growing older population has ignited concerns of the socio-economic challenges that the country will face because of this.

Ethnicity

The Sinhalese make up 74.9% of the population (according to 2012 census) and are concentrated in the densely populated south-west and central parts of the island. 

The Sri Lanka Tamils, who live predominantly in the north and east of the island, form the largest minority group at 11.1% (according to the 2012 census) of the population.

The Moors, descendants of Arab and Indian traders, form the third largest ethnic group at 9.3% of the population. They are mostly concentrated in urban areas in the southern parts of the island with substantial populations in the Central and Eastern provinces. During times of Portuguese colonization, Moors were persecuted, and many forced to retreat to the central highlands and the eastern coast.

There are also Indian Tamils who form a distinct ethnic group comprising 4.1% of the population. The British brought them to Sri Lanka in the 19th century as tea and rubber plantation workers, and they remain concentrated in the "tea country" of south-central Sri Lanka. The Indian Tamils of Sri Lanka were considered to be "stateless" and over 300,000 Indian Tamils were deported back to India, due to the agreement between Sri Lanka and India in 1964. Under the pact, India granted citizenship to the remainder, some 200,000 of whom now live in India. Another 75,000 Indian Tamils, who themselves or whose parents once applied for Indian citizenship, now wish to remain in Sri Lanka. The government has stated these Tamils will not be forced to return to India, although they are not technically citizens of Sri Lanka. By the 1990s most Indian Tamils had received Sri Lankan citizenship, and some even were not granted Sri Lankan citizenship until 2003.

Smaller minorities include the Veddas, the indigenous people of Sri Lanka; Malays who descend from Austronesian settlers; the Burghers, who are descendants of European colonists, principally from Portugal, the Netherlands and, the UK; the ethnic Chinese migrants who came to the island in the 18th and 19th centuries; and the Kaffirs, a small population who are descended from Africans.

Religion

 
 

According to the 2012 census Buddhists make up 70.2% of the population, Hindus 12.6%, Muslims 9.7% and Christians 7.6%. Most Sinhalese are Buddhist; most Tamils are Hindu; and the Moors and Malays are mostly Muslim. Sizeable minorities of both Sinhalese and Tamils are Christians, most of whom are Roman Catholic. The Burgher population is mostly Roman Catholic or Presbyterian. The Veddas have Animist and Buddhist practices. The 1978 constitution, while assuring freedom of religion, gives "the foremost place" to Buddhism.

Languages

Sinhala, an Indo-Aryan language, is the first language of Sinhalese people.

Tamil, a Dravidian language, is the first language of native Sri Lankan Tamils. Tamil is also the first language of the majority of Sri Lankan Moors and the Indian Tamils  - according to the 2012 census 98% of Sri Lankan Moors could speak Tamil but only 59% could speak Sinhala.

English is fluently spoken by approximately 23.8% of the Sri Lanka's population, and widely used for official and commercial purposes.

Malays speak Sri Lanka Malay, a Creole language mixing Sinhala, Tamil and Malay. Many of the Burghers speak Sri Lankan Indo-Portuguese although its use has declined and the majority now speak Sinhala. The Veddas speak Vedda, a Creole language closely based on Sinhala. Use of English has declined since independence, but it continues to be spoken by many in the middle and upper middle classes, particularly in Colombo. According to the 2012 census 24% of the population could speak English. The government is seeking to reverse the decline in the use of English, mainly for economic but also for political reasons. According to the constitution Sinhala and Tamil are official languages whilst English is the link language.

Vital statistics
UN estimates:

Fertility and births
Total Fertility Rate (TFR) (Wanted Fertility Rate) and Crude Birth Rate (CBR):

Births and deaths

Life expectancy

Source: UN World Population Prospects

Population pyramid

Immigrant stock by source country
As of 2017, 40,018 foreign-born people lived in Sri Lanka per United Nations' population division.

CIA World Factbook demographic statistics

The following demographic statistics are from the CIA World Factbook, unless otherwise indicated:

 Population - 21,481,334 (July 2012 est.)
 Age structure - 0–14 years: 23.9% (male 2,594,815/female 2,493,002); 15–64 years: 68% (male 7,089,307/female 7,418,123); 65 years and over: 8.1% (male 803,172/female 926,372) (2010 est.)
 Median age - total: 31.1 years; male: 30.1 years; female: 32.2 years (2012 est.)
 Population growth rate - 0.913% (2012 est.)
 Birth rate - 17.04 births/1,000 population (2012 est.)
 Death rate - 5.96 deaths/1,000 population (July 2012 est.)
 Net migration rate - -1.95 migrant(s)/1,000 population (2012 est.)
 Urbanization - urban population: 14% of total population (2010); rate of urbanization: 1.1% annual rate of change (2010-15 est.)
 Sex ratio - at birth: 1.04 male(s)/female; under 15 years: 1.04 male(s)/female; 15–64 years: 0.96 male(s)/female; 65 years and over: 0.75 male(s)/female; total population: 0.96 male(s)/female (2011 est.)
 Infant mortality rate - total: 9.47 deaths/1,000 live births; male: 10.44 deaths/1,000 live births; female: 8.45 deaths/1,000 live births
 Life expectancy at birth - total population: 75.94 years; male: 72.43 years; female: 79.59 years (2012 est.)
 Total fertility rate - 2.17 children born/woman (2012 est.)
 Health expenditures - 4% of GDP (2009)
 Physicians density - 0.492 physicians/1,000 population (2006)
 Hospital bed density - 3.1 beds/1,000 population (2004)
 HIV/AIDS - adult prevalence rate - less than 0.1% (2009 est.)
 HIV/AIDS - people living with HIV/AIDS - 2,800 (2009 est.)
 HIV/AIDS - deaths - fewer than 200 (2009 est.)
 Major infectious diseases - degree of risk: high; food or waterborne diseases: bacterial diarrhea and hepatitis A; vectorborne disease: dengue fever and chikungunya; water contact disease: leptospirosis; animal contact disease: rabies (2009)
 Nationality - noun: Sri Lankan(s); adjective: Sri Lankan
 Ethnic group - Sinhalese 73.8%;  Sri Lankan Tamil 11.15%;  Sri Lankan Moors 7.2%; Indian Tamil 4.6%; other 0.5%; unspecified 2.75% (2001 census provisional data)
 Religion - Buddhism 70.19%; Hinduism 12.61%; Islam 9.71%; Christianity 7.45%; Other 0.05% (2012  provisional data)
 Languages - Sinhala 74%; Tamil 25%; other 1%
 Literacy - definition: age 15 and over can read and write; total population: 91.2%; male: 92.6%; female:90% (2010 census)

Notes

References

External links